Supersonic refers to any speed over the speed of sound.

Supersonic may also refer to:

Music
 Supersonic (band), a Hungarian indie rock band
 Supersonic Festival (Birmingham), an annual music festival in Birmingham, England
 Supersonic Festival (Seoul), an annual music festival in Seoul, South Korea
 Supersonic Records, a sublabel of GUN Records

Albums
 Supersonic (J. J. Fad album) or the title song (see below), 1988
 Supersonic (Younha album) or the title song, 2012
 Supersonic, by Shola Ama, 2002

Songs
 "Supersonic" (J. J. Fad song), 1988
 "Supersonic" (Jamiroquai song), 1999
 "Supersonic" (Oasis song), 1994
 "Supersonics" (song), by the Presidents of the United States of America, 1996
 "Supersonic", by Bad Religion from The Process of Belief, 2002
 "Supersonic", by Basement Jaxx from Kish Kash, 2003
 "Supasonic", by Beverley Knight from Affirmation, 2004
 "Super-Sonic", by the Brian Jonestown Massacre from Give It Back!, 1997
 "Supersonics" by Caravan Palace from Chronologic, 2019
 "Supersonic", by Cowboy Mouth from Voodoo Shoppe, 2006
 "Supersonic", by Family Force 5 from Business Up Front/Party in the Back, 2006
 "Supersonic", by the Lads from Marvel, 2001
 "Supersonic", by the Mr. T Experience from Big Black Bugs Bleed Blue Blood, 1989
 "Super Sonic", by Music Instructor from Electric City of Music Instructor, 1998
 "Supersonic", by the Nymphs from The Nymphs, 1991
 "Supersonic", by Pearl Jam from Backspacer, 2009
 "Supersonic", by Sophie Ellis-Bextor from Trip the Light Fantastic, 2007
 "Supersonic", by Suddenly, Tammy! from We Get There When We Do, 1995
 "Supersonic (My Existence)", by Skrillex, 2021

Television 
 Supersonic (TV series), a 1975–1977 British pop-music programme
 Supersonic TV, an Albanian music channel

Toys and games 
 Super Sonic, a transformation of the video game character Sonic the Hedgehog
 "Super Sonic", an episode of the animated TV series Sonic the Hedgehog
 Supersonic Software, a partner company of the software developer Codemasters
 Supersonic the Joystick, a wireless controller for the Nintendo Entertainment System made by Camerica

Other uses
 SuperSonic (ISP), a South African Internet service provider
 Supersonic Electronics, a consumer electronics manufacturer
 Seattle SuperSonics, a defunct U.S. professional basketball team
 Ivy Supersonic (born 1967), born Ivy Silberstein, American fashion designer and self-promoter
 Oasis: Supersonic, a 2016 documentary film

See also
 
 Hypersonic (disambiguation)